Ada Milby (born July 6, 1983) is a Filipino rugby player who plays for the Philippine national women's team. She is also the first female member of the World Rugby Council. Ada is the first woman to be appointed to the World Rugby Council, in 2017 she serves on the Regions Committee and Rugby Committee; and she is also a member of the Asia Rugby EXCO since 2016. She heads the Women Advisory Committee and serves on the Admin and Finance Committee. She is now also the President of Philippine Rugby Football Union, being on the board since 2013.

Early life and education
Milby was born to an American father and a Filipino mother in Troy in Ohio in the United States.
Ada Milby has a younger brother Sam Milby who would later be an actor in the Philippines. She grew up in Tipp City in Ohio where she attended high school.

In high school she played American football for the boys' team of her school as a left half back or safety. She described the experience as "unwelcoming". She only stayed in the team for a year due to gender discrimination she encountered from her own male teammates. Prior to playing American football she was a competitive figure skater for 12 years.

She attended the DeVry University for her college studies. It was on her first year of college when she decided to take up rugby when she encountered a booth of girls recruiting rugby players at the Wright State University. She graduated from DeVry with a degree in "Business Management, Klemmer & Associates in Leadership".

After graduating from Devry, Milby entered the US Army in 2005 and was stationed in Iraq for a year. She held the rank of staff sergeant. In Iraq, she served in a 500-personnel battalion, with only 25 women.

She would later come to the Philippines in 2011 to reside with her brother who had settled in the country.

Playing career
Milby made her international debut for the Philippines in 2012 and was designated captain of the rugby union team later that year. She also captained the sevens side. She was part of the rugby sevens squad that competed at the Asian Women's Sevens Series in 2013. She has also competed at the Southeast Asian Games having competed at the 2015 Southeast Asian Games where she helped the team secure a bronze medal, the 2017 Southeast Asian Games., and reclaimed the podium in the 2019 Southeast Asia Games with a silver medal finish.

Rugby administration
Milby is involved with the Philippine Rugby Football Union having served as its Secretary General. In 2013, he was the head of development for grassroots rugby in the country, launching the "Get Into Rugby" program in the same year. This led to her nomination as a member of the Philippine Rugby board of directors. She then became a member of the Asia Rugby Executive Committee and the Women's Rugby Chairperson of the continental body. The World Rugby Council decided in 2017 to allow for 17 new members provided that all of them would be women. Asia Rugby was the first one to respond to the move of the global body naming Milby as the first woman member of the World Rugby Council in mid-November 2017. In 2020, she was named to  Rugby World Magazine's list of Top 50 Most Influential People in Rugby.

Milby was elected as the President of the Philippine Rugby Football Union on December 15 2020, succeeding Rick Santos.

Personal life
As of 2017, Milby has two daughters with the younger born in 2015.

References

1983 births
Living people
United States Army personnel of the Iraq War
Female United States Army personnel
Female rugby union players
Female rugby sevens players
DeVry University alumni
Southeast Asian Games bronze medalists for the Philippines
Southeast Asian Games medalists in rugby union
Competitors at the 2017 Southeast Asian Games
Filipino sports executives and administrators
United States Army non-commissioned officers